Gurcharan Singh (born 10 April 1977) is an Indian professional boxer born in Rurewal, Punjab, and currently settled in Philadelphia, US.

He competed in the light heavyweight division at the 1996 Summer Olympics in Atlanta and the 2000 Summer Olympics in Sydney. Although he lost in the first round at the 1996 Summer Olympics, Singh excelled his boxing performance at the Sydney games by defeating South Korea's Ki Soo-Choi, and South Africa's Danie Venter in the first two rounds. During the quarterfinal match, Singh made an early lead against Ukraine's Andriy Fedchuk; however, he failed to evade a punch in the last round until Fedchuk drew a sudden death point to end the match. As a result, the judges made a decision to break a deadlock and earned a score of 60–42 to the Ukrainian boxer; therefore, Singh did not advance into the semi-final match.

Gurucharan Singh was last employed as a Naik Subedar in the 17 Sikh Battalion in the Indian Army.

Gurucharan Singh relocated to the US and settled in the boxing town of Philadelphia while pursuing his professional boxing career from 2001 to 2010.

Olympic results
1996 (as a light heavyweight boxer)
Lost to Enrique Flores (Puerto Rico) 7–15

2000 (as a light heavyweight boxer)
Defeated Ki Soo-Choi (South Korea) 11–9
Defeated Danie Venter (South Africa) – won after the referee stopped the fourth and final round in the boxing match
Lost to Andriy Fedchuk (Ukraine) 12–+12 (lost by a sudden death point)

Professional boxing
After his disappointing loss in the Olympics semifinal to Andriy Fedchuk, which Gurucharan still believes was an unfair result against him due to a sudden death point, 6 months after the Olympic loss while he was training in Czech at a boxing camp he left without informing anyone, only after a while it was realized that he migrated to USA. As he left without informing anyone at workplace or in the Indian Boxing Federation his then employer Indian Army considered him AWOL (Absent Without Official Leave) and faced and inquiry on arrival.

Career

In 2001 Gurucharan signed up for Pro Boxing in the United States. His first bout was with a lesser known Derrick Minter  which he won in the first round on TKO. He was nicknamed Guru "The Storm" Nagra and had unbeatable run for record 20 straight fights with 11 KO/TKO's before he was stopped in the 10th round by Timur Ibragimov in 2010.  Guru was also promoted as "The world's first professional Asian Heavyweight Boxer", In the later part of his professional boxing career Guru suffered various bodily injuries and subsequent surgeries that kept him away from the ring with only professional 4 bouts from 2004 to 2010
.

Return to India
With the AIBA (international boxing federation) easing its restrictions on professional boxers participating in Olympics or other international boxing events, in 2014 Guru patched up with the Indian Boxing Confederation and the Indian Army and returned to Indian 15 years after he had disappeared with a desire to represent India at the 2016 Rio Olympics

Professional boxing record

References

External links

1977 births
Living people
Indian male boxers
Light-heavyweight boxers
Boxers at the 1996 Summer Olympics
Boxers at the 2000 Summer Olympics
Olympic boxers of India
Boxers at the 1998 Commonwealth Games
Commonwealth Games competitors for India
Asian Games medalists in boxing
Boxers at the 1998 Asian Games
Martial artists from Punjab, India
Asian Games bronze medalists for India
Medalists at the 1998 Asian Games
Recipients of the Arjuna Award